, one slot game for the Java applet Hide1109 developed.

Gameplay
It is basically turning the reels repeat stop aiming the acquisition of bonus game. Bonus based on the Unit 4 Pachislot, Big bonus ends with a rush of 30 games or three bonus games, Regular bonus ends with a getting of 12 games or 8 hits replay (JAC). Also, when you close the game, it is equipped to save function by Cookie.

Development
The game made from Don chan 2 slot machine (Aruze / Universal Entertainment Corporation) the based is one that was port to Java applet, but the contents is a stripped-down version. (Basically, such as flash and LCD animation is equipped with.)

External links
 Official site (Japanese)

2000 video games
Java platform games
Browser games